Ian Riches (born 12 September 1975 in Lincoln) is an English former List A cricketer active 1995 who played for Nottinghamshire.

References

External links
 

1975 births
English cricketers
Nottinghamshire cricketers
Living people
Lincolnshire cricketers
20th-century English people